The episodes of the Japanese original video animation series FLCL were directed by Kazuya Tsurumaki and produced by the FLCL Production Committee, which included Gainax, Production I.G, and Starchild Records. The English adaptation was licensed by Synch-Point,  which released the DVDs and soundtrack. After Synch-Point went out of business, Funimation licensed and re-released the series on Blu-ray and DVD. The story follows Haruko Haruhara, a sociopathic alien drawn to the fictional Japanese suburb of Mabase by the Medical Meccanica building while weaseling in the lives of twelve-year-old Naota Nandaba in the first season and fourteen-year-old Hidomi Hibajiri in the second season as pawns in her agenda to acquire the being called Atomsk.

The first-season episodes aired in North America on Cartoon Network's Adult Swim programming block from August 4 to August 13, 2003.

Six pieces of theme music are used for the episodes; five opening themes and one closing theme. All the theme songs are by Japanese rock band The Pillows. The opening themes are: "One Life", used in episode one, "Instant Music" in episode two and three, "Happy Bivouac" for episode four, "Runners High", utilized in episode five, and "Carnival" in episode six. The closing theme is "Ride on Shooting Star", used for all episodes. Geneon Entertainment has released three original soundtracks encompassing the aforementioned songs, with soundtracks titled Addict, released on January 20, 2004, King of Pirates, released on September 7, 2004, and FLCL No. 3, released on June 7, 2005.

Six DVD compilations, each containing one episode, were released in Japan by Gainax. In addition, a DVD collection box, containing all six DVD compilations, was released in Japan on August 13, 2005. Three compilations were released by Synch-Point in North America. A DVD collection, containing all six was released on January 23, 2007. The series was re-picked up for distribution by Funimation in 2010 and released again on DVD and on Blu-ray in February 2011.

In 2016, two new seasons totaling 12 episodes were announced as a co-production between Production I.G, Toho and Adult Swim. The second season, FLCL Progressive, premiered on June 3, 2018, on Adult Swim's Toonami block, while the third and final season, FLCL Alternative, premiered on September 8, 2018. In Japan, Alternative and Progressive had theatrical screenings in September 2018. The first episode of FLCL Alternative unexpectedly premiered on April Fools' Day 2018 at midnight on Toonami in Japanese with English subtitles.

Two additional seasons were ordered by Adult Swim in March 2022, which were announced on Toonami's 25th anniversary, titled FLCL: Grunge and FLCL: Shoegaze.

Series overview

Episode list

Season 1 (2000–2001)

Season 2: Progressive (2018)

Season 3: Alternative (2018)

Season 4: Grunge (2023)

Season 5: Shoegaze (2023)

Films
In September 2018, Toho theatrically released the FLCL Progressive and FLCL Alternative sequel seasons as compilation films. They are exclusive to Japan.

See also
List of FLCL characters
Discography of FLCL

Notes

References

General references 

 − An official artbook.

External links
Official Gainax website 
Official Adult Swim website

FLCL
FLCL episode lists